Hayward Park station is one of three Caltrain stations in San Mateo, California. It is a short distance south of the site of the Southern Pacific station at Hayward Park.

The station is planned to be modified to accommodate through-running California High-Speed Rail service.

References

External links

Caltrain Hayward Park station page

Caltrain stations in San Mateo County, California
Former Southern Pacific Railroad stations in California